The 1928 Toledo Rockets football team was an American football team that represented Toledo University (renamed the University of Toledo in 1967) in the Northwest Ohio League (NOL) during the 1928 college football season. In their third season under head coach Boni Petcoff, the Rockets compiled a 1–6 overall record and 1–3 in conference.

Schedule

References

Toledo
Toledo Rockets football seasons
Toledo Rockets football